The white-edged oriole (Icterus graceannae) is a species of bird in the family Icteridae. It is found in Ecuador and Peru.

Its natural habitats are subtropical or tropical dry forests and subtropical or tropical moist lowland forests. It is primarily a canopy dweller.

Description

Icterus graceannae was named in 1867 by naturalist John Cassin in honor of his protege, pioneer American female ornithologist Graceanna Lewis. His description of the species first appeared in print in the Proceedings of the Academy of Natural Sciences, published in Philadelphia in 1867.

Conservation status

Due to its reasonably broad distribution and the diversity of its suitable habitat, most experts consider the threat of significant population decline to be minimal. The global population sizes and population changes have yet to be quantitatively measured. The species remains listed as Least Concern by Birdlife International.

Footnotes

 Zipcodezoo.com.

white-edged oriole
Birds of Ecuador
Birds of Peru
Birds of the Tumbes-Chocó-Magdalena
white-edged oriole
Taxonomy articles created by Polbot